Iván Vázquez Rodríguez (born 28 July 1988) is a Spanish football manager.

Career
Born in Santiago de Compostela, A Coruña, Galicia, Vázquez began his career with hometown side SD Compostela, as a youth manager and youth coordinator, and was also a first team manager at lowly locals SD Cacheiras. In 2015, he moved to Deportivo de La Coruña, as a coordinator of the Technification area and also a youth manager.

On 31 July 2018, Vázquez was named manager of the Cadete side of Racing de Ferrol. He left the side on 21 December, and moved abroad on 1 February 2019, after being named manager of the under-16 side of Ecuadorian side Independiente del Valle.

Vázquez was in charge of del Valle's under-20 side which won the 2020 U-20 Copa Libertadores, and left the side in April 2021 to take over Serie B side . He left the latter club on 20 October, after avoiding relegation.

On 7 June 2022, Vázquez replaced Juan Urquiza at the helm of Serie A side Técnico Universitario. On 13 August, however, he was removed from the role.

Honours
Independiente del Valle U20
U-20 Copa Libertadores: 2020

References

External links

1988 births
Living people
Sportspeople from Santiago de Compostela
Spanish football managers
C.D. Técnico Universitario managers
Spanish expatriate football managers
Spanish expatriate sportspeople in Ecuador
Expatriate football managers in Ecuador